Lipovica is a peak in Kosovo.

Annotations

References

Mountains of Kosovo
Borders of Kosovo